Orange is a 2012 Indian Malayalam-language film directed by Biju Varkey who had earlier directed films like Devadasi, Chandranilekkulla Vazhi and Phantom.

Plot 
Yakobi is an orphan who works in a dairy farm, where he drives his own lorry on a contract basis. Orange is the name of his lorry. He falls in love with Saritha and they marry.  His sisters and relatives are not informed of this marriage. Later Saritha bears a daughter, Orange. Whenever he goes to his native place, his relatives enquire why he remains a bachelor.

As usual when Yakobi was returning to Kambam after visiting his native place, a man asked him a free lift. While continuing their journey Yakobi learns that his name is Jith and he is going to an interview for a job  in the  dairy farm where Yakobi works. But they fail to arrive at the farm  within time.  Yakobi arranges a temporary job for Muthu at the dairy farm.

When Yakobi meets one of his old friends Baboottan, he invites him to his house and this serves as the turning point in the story.

Cast 
 Kalabhavan Mani as Yakobi
 Biju Menon  as Baboottan
 Salim Kumar  as Ashan
 Jaffar Idukki as Shivaji
 Lena as Saritha
 Machan Varghese as Allavuddin
 Manikandan Pattambi 
 Sona Nair as Pullachi Thanku
 Prakash Nath as Jithu
 Saravanan as Thevar
 Diya Babu  as Orange

Production
Biju Varkey and Suresh Kochamminy have jointly written the story. The director Biju Varkey himself has written the dialogue. Ramalingam handles the cinematography. The movie has been produced under the banner of Swaraj films by Ravi Bangalore.

The music was given by Manikanth Kadri for the lyrics written by Rafeeque Ahmed and Afzal Yusuf composed one song with lyrics by C.R. Menon.

The film has been shot on locations at Marayoor.

Soundtrack 
The film's soundtrack contains 5 songs, all composed by Manikanth Kadri and Afzal Yusuf. Lyrics by Rafeeq Ahmed, C. R. Menon and Muthamizhu.

References

2012 films
2010s Malayalam-language films
Films scored by Afzal Yusuf